Top Model India is an Indian English-language reality television series, which  premiered on 4 February 2018 and broadcast on Colors Infinity. The series is an Indian version of Tyra Banks-created 2003 American reality television series America's Next Top Model. The viewers will see several men and women compete for the title of Top Model India, providing them with an opportunity to begin their career in the modeling industry.

This is the rebooted inception of MTV India's India's Next Top Model.

Mahir Pandhi is the winner of the 1st cycle of the show.

Judges & Mentors

Cycles

See also

India's Next Top Model
MTV Supermodel of the Year

References

Indian reality television series
Colors Infinity original programming
2018 Indian television series debuts
Indian television series based on American television series
Top Model